The 1500 metres distance for men in the 2011–12 ISU Speed Skating World Cup was contested over six races on six occasions, out of a total of seven World Cup occasions for the season, with the first occasion taking place in Chelyabinsk, Russia, on 18–20 November 2011, and the final occasion taking place in Berlin, Germany, on 9–11 March 2012.

Håvard Bøkko of Norway won the cup, while Kjeld Nuis of the Netherlands came second, and the defending champion, Shani Davis of the United States, came third.

Top three

Race medallists

Standings 
Standings as of 11 March 2012 (end of the season).

References 

Men 1500